Euphaedra variabilis is a butterfly in the family Nymphalidae. It is found in Gabon and the central part of the Democratic Republic of the Congo.

References

Butterflies described in 1976
variabilis